Laura Patricia Spinadel (7 July 1958 in Buenos Aires, Argentina) is an Austrian Argentine architect, urban planner, writer, educator and principal of the firm BUSarchitektur and of the company BOA büro für offensive aleatorik in Vienna. Laura P. Spinadel has made an international name based on her Compact City  and  works, both considered pioneers of the holistic architecture ideology.
She is Doctor Honoris Causa at the Civic Parliament of the Humanity, Transacademy Universal Institute of Nations.

Education and teaching 
Spinadel studied architecture at the FADU University of Buenos Aires where she was honoured with the Gold Medal Diploma. Her mother, Vera W. de Spinadel was an Argentine mathematician considered a leader in the field of "Metallic Means". Her father, Erico Spinadel is an Austrian engineer considered a world eminence in wind energy issues.

In the mid-1980s, Spinadel taught at the University of Buenos Aires Urban Strategies and at the same time she was Director of Community Interactions for Foreign Relations and Co-operational Projects. She served as guest professor at the Universidad Pontificia Bolivariana in Medellín, Colombia; Università delli Studi di Palermo in Palermo, Italy; Escuela Superior Técnica de Arquitectura de Barcelona ETSAB in Barcelona, Spain; MKSSS's Dr. B. N. College of Architecture – Pune, India; Universidad Católica de Córdoba in Córdoba, Argentina; Colegio Oficial de Arquitectos de Tabasco in Villahermosa, México; Faculdade de Arquitetura da Universidade Federal do Rio Grande do Sul in Porto Alegre, Brazil.

Architecture and planning 
The work of Laura P. Spinadel is marked by the pursuit of comprehensiveness in ideas, processes and results undoubtedly influenced by the anthroposophical education. Since starting out with a humanistic, theosophical and sensualist vision, Laura P. Spinadel has moved towards a holistic and ecological position, that seeks to put maximum emphasis on the health of open and closed spaces, as well as on the requirements and principles of bio-construction. Holistic thinking implies profoundly replacing rational and analytical thought with a more inclusive thinking, in which all factors are taken into account, even those that seem trivial or invisible, such as perception, health or freedom.
The Compact City in Vienna, Austria (1995-2001), was based on superimposed layers, compactness and high density structures. The project required that the architects get the agreement of many public and private company-stakeholders in order to create a completely self-contained autonomous block. The result is a layered city.
The Master Plan for the Campus WU (Vienna University of Economics and Business) in Vienna, Austria (2007-2015) is by nature as complex as it is evolutionary. It embodies a multivalent negotiation of scales, conceptual principles, architectural territories and operative methodologies. In this sense, the Master Plan operates as an interactive device and abstract machine, a living body that is, in the end, a subject of its own material evolution. The Master Plan as mediator promotes multi-scalar negotiations.

Research and Innovation Tools 
The interest in extending Architecture to multi-dimensional plans led Spinadel to develop instruments for multi-sector participation at various levels of approach to the city product. She is working on the future planning Urban Menus an Interactive Society Game to create our cities in 3D using a consensual approach.  Spinadel was honored with the Granting Promotion XL Innovation aws Austria Wirtschaftsservice Gesellschaft of the Creative Industries (2017), the Impact Innovation funding from the Austrian Research Promotion Agency FFG (2020)  and the Granting aws technology internationalization with URBAN MENUS India market study for a Smart Area Development solution (2021)

Selected works 
 Campus WU Vienna University of Economics and Business Administration Vienna II., Austria 2013
 Teaching Center Campus WU Vienna II., Austria 2013
 Housing Patchwork at the Hoffmannpark – Purkersdorf, Austria 2005
 Homeworkers at the Compact City Vienna XXI., Austria 2002
 Kindergarten at the Erlachplatz – Vienna X., Austria 1999

Awards 
At the XV International Biennial of Architecture of Buenos Aires BA 15, Spinadel won the BA 15 Award and also the Contest of the International Committee of Architectural Critics CICA 2015 in Urbanism. In 2015, she was honored with the Architecture Award of the City of Vienna. She is the first woman awarded 2014 with the Golden Ring of Honour of Vienna University of Economics and Business.
Other prestigious awards and honors received by Laura P. Spinadel include: Ernst A. Plischke Award 2014, Otto Wagner Urban Design Award Az W PSK 1998, Outstanding Artist Award for Experimental Trends in Architecture BMUK 1989  among others.

Museum exhibitions 
 Indian Art House Gallery – Pune, India 2016
 Austrian Cultural Forum – Washington, USA 2015
Centro Cultural Recoleta – Buenos Aires, Argentina 2013 2011
 Architekturzentrum Wien Vienna, Austria 2009
 Austrian Cultural Forum New York USA 2003
 Semper Depot Wien – Vienna, Austria 2003

Bibliography 
Books by Laura P. Spinadel include Campus WU: A Holistic History – Editor BOA büro für offensive aleatorik – 2013   ; Urban unconscious – BUSarchitektur & Friends– Libria Editrice – 2003 ; Perceptions by BUSarchitektur – Projects and Buildings 1986/1999 Libria Editrice 2001

References

External links 

 BUSarchitektur
 BOA Büro für offensive Aleatorik
 Urban Menus
 Objekte ergeben noch keine Stadt Portrait in "Die Presse"
 VII Foro Internacional de Parques 
 Studieren im Wunderland 
 Stadtwachstum ohne Nachverdichtung? 
 Architecture Today BUSarchitektur 
 On Location Vienna WU Campus 
 Spotlight on Smart Cities: Me, Them, and URBAN MENUS

Austrian women architects
Argentine women architects
1958 births
Living people
Argentine people of Austrian descent
University of Buenos Aires alumni
Academic staff of the University of Buenos Aires